Bidault is a surname. Notable people with the surname include:

 Georges Bidault (1899–1983), French politician
 Marcel-Ernest Bidault (born 1938), French cyclist 
 Raphaële Bidault-Waddington (born 1971), French artist-researcher

Surnames of Norman origin
Germanic-language surnames